Ricardo Gabriel Lunari Del Federico (born 6 February 1970) is an Argentine football manager and former player.

Playing career

Lunari started his career in 1991 with Newell's Old Boys in Argentina, he was a young member of two championship winning teams before moving to Chile in 1993 to play for Universidad Católica.

In his first season with UC he was part of the team that reached the final of the Copa Libertadores. He then had short spells with
Atlas and Puebla in Mexico and Millonarios in Colombia before returning to UC in 1996. In 1997 the club won the National Championship. He scored the last goal in the 3–0 final match against Colo-Colo.

In 1998, he joined Spanish club Salamanca in La Liga, before moving to Portugal to play for Farense.

In 2000 Lunari returned to Argentina to play for Almagro. Towards the end of his career he played for Oriente Petrolero in Bolivia Estudiantes de Mérida in Venezuela and amateur side Guspini in Italy.

Coaching career
After retiring as a player Lunari took his coaching qualifications. He is a level 1 qualified coach in Italy, and obtained his international coaching licence in England. In March 2008, Lunari made his coaching debut with Bolivian first division club Guabirá, but after only five games into the season he resigned from his duties due to poor team performance. He later joined Fernando Gamboa as his assistant coach when he took over Newell's Old Boys in August 2008.

On 18 January 2019, Lunari was appointed as the manager of Colón FC from Montevideo, Uruguay.

From 2021 to 2022, he was in charge of Provincial Osorno in the Chilean Tercera A.

Honours

Club
Newell's Old Boys
 Argentine Primera División (2): 1990–1991,
 Argentine Clausura Tournament (1): Clausura 1992
 Copa Libertadores (1): Runner-up 1992

Universidad Católica
 Primera División de Chile (1): 1997 Apertura

Oriente Petrolero
 Liga de Fútbol Profesional Boliviano (1): 2001

References

External links
 Argentine Primera statistics
 Ricardo Lunari at Footballdatabase

1970 births
Argentine people of Italian descent
Living people
People from Caseros Department
Argentine footballers
Argentine expatriate footballers
Association football midfielders
Newell's Old Boys footballers
Club Deportivo Universidad Católica footballers
Atlas F.C. footballers
Club Puebla players
Millonarios F.C. players
UD Salamanca players
S.C. Farense players
Club Almagro players
Oriente Petrolero players
Estudiantes de Mérida players
Argentine Primera División players
Chilean Primera División players
Liga MX players
Categoría Primera A players
La Liga players
Primeira Liga players
Bolivian Primera División players
Venezuelan Primera División players
Argentine football managers
Santiago Morning managers
Newell's Old Boys managers
Millonarios F.C. managers
Club Blooming managers
Primera B de Chile managers
Argentine Primera División managers
Categoría Primera A managers
Bolivian Primera División managers
Expatriate footballers in Chile
Expatriate footballers in Mexico
Expatriate footballers in Colombia
Expatriate footballers in Spain
Expatriate footballers in Portugal
Expatriate footballers in Bolivia
Expatriate footballers in Venezuela
Expatriate footballers in Uruguay
Expatriate footballers in Italy
Expatriate football managers in Bolivia
Expatriate football managers in Chile
Expatriate football managers in Colombia
Expatriate football managers in Uruguay
Argentine expatriate sportspeople in Chile
Argentine expatriate sportspeople in Mexico
Argentine expatriate sportspeople in Colombia
Argentine expatriate sportspeople in Spain
Argentine expatriate sportspeople in Portugal
Argentine expatriate sportspeople in Bolivia
Argentine expatriate sportspeople in Venezuela
Argentine expatriate sportspeople in Uruguay
Argentine expatriate sportspeople in Italy
Sportspeople from Santa Fe Province